Dan Kieran (born 10 June 1975) is a British travel writer, humorist, literary editor and entrepreneur. He is best known for his travel books and for his role as deputy editor of The Idler between 2000 and 2010. He is also a CEO and co-founder (with John Mitchinson and Justin Pollard) of the publishing company Unbound.

Kieran is author of The Idle Traveller, I Fought The Law, Planes, Trains and Automobiles and Three Men In A Float (with Ian Vince).

Three Men In A Float became a half-hour BBC Radio 4 programme of the same name, which Kieran presented with Ian Vince and Prasanth Visweswaran. It aired on 27 February 2008.

Kieran is editor of Idler Books' Crap Jobs, Crap Holidays (Crap Vacations in the United States), The Book of Idle Pleasures; and co-editor of two volumes of Crap Towns.

His writing credits include The Observer, The Sunday Times, The Daily Telegraph, The Times and The Guardian.

Published Books
 Crap Jobs: 100 Tales of Workplace Hell (2005) Harper Paperbacks,  Telegraph
 The Idler Book of Crap Towns: The 50 Crap Worst Places to Live in the UK (with Sam Jordison) (2006), Macmillan UK, 
 The Idler Book of Crap Towns II (2006) Macmillan UK.  (Telegraph review
 The "Idler" Book of Crap Holidays (2005) Bantam, 
 How Very Interesting: Peter Cook's Universe and all that surrounds it (2006) Snow Books
 The Myway Code (with Ian Vince) (2006), Boxtree Ltd, 
 I Fought the Law  (2007), Bantam, 
 The Book Of Idle Pleasures (2008), Ebury Press
 Three Men In A Float (with Ian Vince) (2008), John Murray Ltd, 
 Planes, Trains and Automobiles (2009), John Murray Ltd, 
 The Idle Traveller (2012), Automobile Association,  Telegraph review
 The Surfboard (2018), Unbound,

References

External links
Virgin Podcast Interview
3:AM Magazine interview
Londonpaper Interview
Stockport Express article
The Idler
BBC article by Sam Jordison
Dan Kieran's website
Review of I Fought The Law in The Independent
Tony Blair's recommended reading list (top of the list: I Fought The Law) in The Times

1975 births
British magazine editors
Living people